The Basketball Tournament 2014 was the first edition of The Basketball Tournament, a 5-on-5, single elimination basketball tournament. The tournament involved 32 teams; it started on June 6 and continued through June 28, 2014. The winner of the final, Notre Dame Fighting Alumni, received a half-million dollar prize. The championship game was played in Boston, at Case Gym on the campus of Boston University, and was broadcast on ESPN3.

Format
The tournament field started with 32 teams; 24 teams were selected based on the size of their fan groups, and eight teams were selected at-large by TBT organizers.

The winning team received a half-million dollars, while fans entered into an online "Fanwagon Sweepstakes" for various raffle prizes including $25,000 cash.

Venues
The Basketball Tournament 2014 took place in two locations.

Tournament founder Jonathan Mugar has said that the attendance at the first game was only 17 people.

Bracket

Pod 1

Pod 2

Pod 3

Pod 4

Semifinals & final

Source:

Awards
MVP: Tyrone Nash of Notre Dame Fighting Alumni

References

Further reading

External links
 TBT Flashback - 2014 Championship Game via YouTube
 TBT 2014 Final Standings at pointstreak.com

The Basketball Tournament
2014–15 in American basketball
2014 in Boston
2014 in sports in Massachusetts
2014 in sports in Pennsylvania
June 2014 sports events in the United States
Basketball competitions in Philadelphia
Basketball competitions in Boston